Ayutla is a town and municipality, in Jalisco in central-western Mexico. The municipality covers an area of  884.62 km².

As of 2005, the municipality had a total population of 12,221.

Populated places within Ayutla include San Miguel de la Sierra.

References

Municipalities of Jalisco